Bobby Lyngdoh Nongbet (born 11 November 1981) is a Indian professional football manager. He is current manager of I-League 2 club Shillong Lajong.

Coaching career

Youth coach
Bobby Nongbet began his career as youth coach at Shillong Lajong and Royal Wahingdoh. In 2015, Nonbget passed AFC 'A' certification course.

Shillong Lajong
Nongbet was appointed as the head coach for 2017–18 I-League season.

References

External links

Living people
Indian football managers
I-League managers
Shillong Lajong FC managers
Year of birth missing (living people)